Frederick B. Teter (August 9, 1873 – June 7, 1922) was an American politician in the state of Washington. He served in the Washington House of Representatives from 1919 to 1923. He was a doctor, owned a hospital, and was blind.

References

Republican Party members of the Washington House of Representatives
1873 births
1922 deaths
American blind people